Mount Français is a mountain which forms the summit of Anvers Island, Antarctica, in the Antarctic claims of the United Kingdom, Argentina and Chile. It stands southeast of the center of the island and 6 miles north of Borgen Bay.

History
Mount Français was first seen by the members of the Belgian Antarctic Expedition, who explored the southeast coast of the island in 1898. It was later sighted by the French Antarctic Expedition team members, 1903–05, under Charcot, who named it for the expedition ship Français.

Mount Français was first summited on 7 December 1955 by Jim Rennie, Arthur Shewry, and Bill Hindson, members of the Falkland Islands Dependencies Survey who had spent the 1955 winter at Base E, newly constructed north of Arthur Harbor on Anvers Island.

See also
 List of Ultras of Antarctica
 List of islands by highest point

References

External links
 "Mount Français, Antarctica" on Peakbagger

Mount Francais
Mountains of the Palmer Archipelago